Christine Jordis real name Marie-Christine Morel de Foucaucourt (born 4 January 1942 in Algiers) is a French writer, journalist and editor, a specialist in English literature.

Biography 

A graduate from the Sorbonne and Harvard University, she moved to London to prepare her PhD thesis on black humor in English literature and taught there for several years.

On her return to France, she became responsible for English literature at the British Council (1979–1991).

She collabored with La Nouvelle Revue française, then  and Le Monde.

From 1991 to 2012, Christine Jordis was director of English fiction at Éditions Gallimard and member of the reading committee of the publishing house. She has also been a member of the Prix Baudelaire de la traduction since 1985, the Prix du Meilleur Livre Étranger since 1992, the Prix Fémina since 1996, the Prix Cazes since 2006 and the Prix du roman arabe since 2008. She is now a member of the reading committee of Éditions Grasset.

On 15 May 2009 she was made an officer of the Ordre national du Mérite and of the Ordre des Arts et des Lettres.

Works 
1989: De petits enfers variés, Seuil, (Prix Femina Vacaresco and Prix Marcel-Thiébaut)
1996: Jean Rhys, la prisonnière, Stock
1999: Gens de la Tamise et d'autre rivages : le roman anglais au XXe siècle, Seuil — Prix Médicis essai
1999: Le Paysage et l'Amour dans le roman anglais, Seuil
2001: Bali, Java, en rêvant, Éditions du Rocher
2003: La Chambre blanche, Seuil
2004: Promenade en terres bouddhistes de Birmanie, Seuil
2005: Une passion excentrique : Visites anglaises, Seuil, (Prix Valery-Larbaud and Prix Anna de Noailles.)
2006: Birmanie, Seuil
2006: Gandhi, Gallimard
2008: Un lien étroit, Seuil, (Prix Cabourg)
2008: Promenades anglaises, 
2009: L'Aventure du désert, Gallimard
2012: Une vie pour l'impossible, Gallimard, (Prix du roman de la Fondation de France Charles Oulmont)
2014: William Blake ou l'infini, Albin Michel, (Prix Société des Gens de Lettres de l'essai)
2016: Paysage d'hiver. Voyage en compagnie d'un sage, Albin Michel

References

External links 
 Christine Jordis on Babelio
 Christine Jordis sur les traces d'un sage coréen: Kim Jeong Hui on YouTube
 Christine Jordis on France Culture
 "L'Aventure du désert", de Christine Jordis : vivre à hauteur de mort on Le Monde (17 December 2009)
 Christine Jordis, Une vie pour l’impossible : La liberté sous toutes formes on L'Intern@ute

20th-century French journalists
21st-century French journalists
French women journalists
20th-century French writers
21st-century French writers
French editors
French women editors
French women critics
French literary critics
Women literary critics
Prix Médicis essai winners
Officers of the Ordre national du Mérite
Officiers of the Ordre des Arts et des Lettres
Harvard University alumni
1942 births
People from Algiers
Living people
20th-century French women
21st-century French women